Crossotus erlangeri is a species of beetle in the family Cerambycidae. It was described by Hintz in 1912.

References

erlangeri
Beetles described in 1912